John Evan Baldwin FRS (6 December 1931 – 7 December 2010) was a British astronomer who worked at the Cavendish Astrophysics Group (formerly Mullard Radio Astronomy Observatory) from 1954. He played a role in the development of interferometry in Radio Astronomy, and later astronomical optical interferometry and lucky imaging. He made the first maps of the radio emission from the Andromeda Galaxy and the Perseus Cluster, and measured the properties of many active galaxies. In 1985 he performed the first Aperture Masking Interferometry observations, and then led the construction and operation of the Cambridge Optical Aperture Synthesis Telescope, and helped develop the lucky imaging method. In 2001 he was awarded the Jackson-Gwilt Medal for his technical contributions to the fields of interferometry and aperture synthesis.

He matriculated as a member of Queens' College, Cambridge in 1949 and was a Life Fellow of the College from 1999 to his death in 2010.

References

External links
 - John Baldwin's page at the MRAO
 - Photo of John Baldwin with Jan Hendrik Oort, Bob Rubin and Vera Rubin

1931 births
2010 deaths
20th-century British astronomers
Alumni of Queens' College, Cambridge
Fellows of Queens' College, Cambridge
Fellows of the Royal Society